Murray Theater, also known as the Richmond Civic Theater-Norbert Silbiger Theater, is a historic theatre building located at Richmond, Wayne County, Indiana.  It was built in 1909, and is a three-story, steel frame and brick building with Chicago School and Beaux-Arts style design influences. The auditorium was originally designed to seat 751.

It was listed on the National Register of Historic Places in 1982.

References

External links
rGreenRoom Theater Archive Wiki: Murray Theatre (Richmond, Indiana)

Theatres on the National Register of Historic Places in Indiana
Beaux-Arts architecture in Indiana
Theatres completed in 1909
Buildings and structures in Richmond, Indiana
National Register of Historic Places in Wayne County, Indiana
Chicago school architecture in Indiana